In the United States, a National Heritage Area (NHA) is a site designated by Act of Congress, intended to encourage historic preservation of the area and an appreciation of the history and heritage of the site. There are currently 62 NHAs, some of which use variations of the title, such as National Heritage Corridor.

National Heritage Areas are not National Park Service units or federally owned or managed land. NHAs are administered by state governments or non-profit organizations or other private corporations, referred to as local coordinating entities. The National Park Service provides an advisory role and limited technical, planning and financial assistance.

Each area has its own authorizing legislation and a set of unique resources and goals. Areas considered for designation must have specific elements. First, the landscape must be a nationally unique natural, cultural, historic, or scenic resource.  Second, when the related sites are linked, they must tell a unique story about the U.S.

Legislative history 
The first NHA created, the Illinois & Michigan Canal National Heritage Corridor, located in Illinois, was signed into law by President Ronald Reagan on August 21, 1984.

The National Heritage Areas Act of 2006 designated ten new NHAs and authorized authorized three studies of potential NHAs. It was signed into law by President George W. Bush on October 12, 2006.

The Omnibus Public Land Management Act of 2009 designated ten new NHAs. The bill was signed into law by President Barack Obama on March 30, 2009. 

The John D. Dingell Jr. Conservation, Management, and Recreation Act of 2019 laid out procedures for planning and management of NHAs and designated six new NHAs. It was signed into law by President Donald Trump on March 12, 2019.

The National Heritage Area Act of 2022 established a National Heritage Area System and created a standardized process for the Department of the Interior to provide financial and technical assistance to NHAs. The law also provides a process for the study and designation of new NHAs and evaluation for existing NHAs. It authorized three studies of potential NHAs and established seven new NHAs. The bill was passed by the Senate on December 20, 2022 by unanimous consent and the House on December 22 (on a vote of 326-95), and was signed into law by President Joe Biden on January 5, 2023.

List of National Heritage Areas

Current 
There are 55 National Heritage Areas, listed below with their respective local coordinating entity:

Proposed

See also
 Hispanic Heritage Sites (U.S. National Park Service)
 African-American Heritage Sites (U.S. National Park Service)
 Native American Heritage Sites (U.S. National Park Service)
 Women's History Sites (U.S. National Park Service)

References

External links
 National Park Service: Official National Heritage Areas website
 Alliance of National Heritage Areas

 
Historic preservation in the United States
National Park Service areas